Torday is a surname. Notable people with the surname include:

Emil Torday (1875–1931), Hungarian anthropologist
Paul Torday (1946–2013), British writer
Piers Torday (born 1974), British writer, son of Paul
Ursula Torday (1912–1997), English writer